Kajsa Nilsson (born 9 February 1982) is a Swedish orienteering competitor. She received a silver medal in the relay event and a bronze medal in the sprint distance at the 2006 World Orienteering Championships in Aarhus.

References

External links

1982 births
Living people
Swedish orienteers
Female orienteers
Foot orienteers
World Orienteering Championships medalists
Competitors at the 2009 World Games
21st-century Swedish women
Junior World Orienteering Championships medalists